Duncanson is a Scottish patronymic surname meaning "son of Duncan". People with the name Duncanson include:

 Albert Duncanson (1911– ), Canadian, Olympic ice hockey player
 Craig Duncanson (b. 1967), Canadian professional ice hockey left winger
 Jimmy Duncanson (1919–1996), Scottish footballer 
 John Duncanson (clergyman) (c. 1530–1601), Scottish clergyman, tutor and chaplain to King James VI
 John Duncanson (broadcaster), former British television continuity announcer and presenter
 Kirk Duncanson FRSE (1846–1913) botanist and surgeon
 Robert Duncanson (Army officer) (1657–1705), Scottish military officer
 Robert Scott Duncanson (c. 1822–1872), African American artist

See also
 Duncan (surname)

Patronymic surnames